Corteno Golgi is an Italian village and comune in the central Alps, in the province of Brescia, Lombardy, northern Italy. It is in the Val Camonica.

There is a museum dedicated to scientist Camillo Golgi who was born in Corteno in 1843. Golgi, after whose memory the name of the village was changed in 1956 from just Corteno to the present name, was the first Italian to be awarded with the Nobel Prize in Physiology or Medicine in 1906.

Twin towns
Corteno Golgi is twinned with:

  Petilla de Aragón, Spain

References

External links 
 

Cities and towns in Lombardy